Appleton is a city in Swift County, Minnesota, United States. Its population was 1,412 at the 2010 census.  The town is home to a vacant medium-security prison, the Prairie Correctional Facility, which is wholly owned and operated by Corrections Corporation of America. Appleton also includes a plant-protein factory operated by Eat Just, Inc.

Elmer A. Benson, who served as a United States Senator and as governor of Minnesota, was born in Appleton on September 22, 1895. Appleton is also home to many retirees and military veterans. All of its twenty-odd streets, except Minnesota Street, are named for local veterans who died in combat.

History
Appleton was laid out in 1872, and named after Appleton, Wisconsin. A post office has been in operation at Appleton since 1873. Appleton was incorporated in 1881.

Gethsemane Episcopal Church, on North Hering Street at Snelling Avenue, was built in 1879 and was listed on the National Register of Historic Places in 2011.

Geography
The Pomme de Terre River flows through the city and continues 10 miles to the west and south into Marsh Lake on the Minnesota River.

U.S. Highway 59 and Minnesota State Highways 7 and 119 are the main routes in the city.

Demographics

2010 census
As of the census of 2010,  1,412 people, 677 households, and 342 families were living in the city. The 851 housing units averaged . The racial makeup of the city was 92.8% White, 1.3% African American, 1.1% Native American, 0.5% Asian, 0.1% Pacific Islander, 2.3% from other races, and 1.8% from two or more races. Hispanics or Latinos of any race were 4.2% of the population.

Of the 677 households, 22.3% had children under 18 living with them, 35.6% were married couples living together, 10.8% had a female householder with no husband present, 4.1% had a male householder with no wife present, and 49.5% were not families. About 44.9% of all households were made up of individuals, and 24.8% had someone living alone who was 65  or older. The average household size was 2.00, and the average family size was 2.78.

The median age in the city was 48.5 years; 20% of residents were under the age of 18; 6.5% were between  18 and 24; 20% were from 25 to 44; 26.2% were from 45 to 64; and 27.5% were 65 or older. The gender makeup of the city was 46.6% male and 53.4% female.

2000 census
As of the census of 2000,  2,871 people, 729 households, and 376 families were living in the city. The racial makeup of the city was 68.13% White, 10.73% African American, 1.57% Native American, 5.02% Asian, 6.27% Pacific Islander, 2.40% from other races, and 5.89% from two or more races. Hispanics or Latinos of any race were 4.84% of the population. Totals include about 1,000 inmates in the prison.

Of the 729 households,  23.5% had children under the age of 18 living with them, 40.1% were married couples living together, 8.6% had a female householder with no husband present, and 48.4% were not families. About 45.5% of all households were made up of individuals, and 27.4% had someone living alone who was 65 years of age or older.  The average household size was 2.02, and the average family size was 2.82.

In the city, the age distribution was  12.1% under 18, 9.2% from 18 to 24, 42.7% from 25 to 44, 19.9% from 45 to 64, and 16.2% who were 65  or older.  The median age was 39 years. For every 100 females, there were 240.6 males.  For every 100 females age 18 and over, there were 266.9 males.

Males had a median income of $26,991 versus $20,991 for females. The per capita income for the city was $12,429. About 9.9% of families and 14.7% of the population were below the poverty line, including 14.9% of those under age 18 and 23.2% of those age 65 or over.

Education
Appleton Public Schools are part of the Lac Qui Parle Valley School District. Schools in the district include MMN Elementary School, Appleton Elementary School, LqPV Middle School and Lac Qui Parle Valley High School.

Appleton Elementary School is located in Appleton.

Ranae Tostenson is the superintendent of schools.

Media

Television stations
Appleton did have one full-service television station, PBS member station KWCM-TV. Pioneer Public TV moved from Appleton to Granite Falls in 2016. Appleton is also home to several low-power free-to-air and pay TV stations that show programming normally seen on cable television. While this phenomenon is fairly common in Canada, it is unusual in the United States. These stations are licensed to Appleton:

Free-to-air stations:
KWCM-TV analog 10/digital 31 (PBS)
K56BZ analog 56 - KARE via K50AG (NBC)
K58EO analog 58 - WFTC (MyNetworkTV)

Defunct TV stations:
K15DC analog 15 - A&E
K17CS analog 17 - TBS (not WTBS)
K19CW analog 19 - USA Network
K21AK analog 21 - Nickelodeon (owned by Teleview Systems of Minnesota, Inc.)
K23DF analog 23 - Discovery Channel
K29CC analog 29 - ABC Family
K31BT - (formerly CNN, shut down for KWCM-DT's signal)
K33CR - (formerly Showtime)
K49ED analog 49 - TNT
K52AH analog 52 - Spike TV (formerly TNN)
K54AK - KMSP-TV (Fox)
K60AB - (formerly FSN North)

Notable people

 Elmer Austin Benson (September 22, 1895 – March 13, 1985) was an American lawyer and politician from Appleton, Minnesota. In 1935, Elmer Benson was appointed to the U.S. Senate following the death of Thomas Schall and in 1936 he was elected as Governor of Minnesota (1937 – 1939).
 Charles Peter “Chuck” Brown (April 3, 1951 – August 14, 2003) - politician and former member of the Minnesota House of Representatives (1985 – 1996)
 Jerry Koosman - former Major League Baseball pitcher
 Martin J. McGowan, Jr. (October 28, 1920 – August 13, 2009) - editor, publisher of the Appleton Press, (1942 - 1964), and former member of the Minnesota House of Representatives (1959 – 1966)
 Brad Rheingans - former professional wrestler
 Clinton Sundberg - Hollywood actor
 Herbert A. Winkelmann - pioneering rubber chemist at B.F. Goodrich
 Edward T. Young (October 27, 1858 – September 19, 1940) - Minnesota Attorney General (1905 - 1909), Minnesota House of Representatives (1889 - 1890 and 1893 - 1894) and Minnesota Senate (1895 - 1902)

References

External links

City of Appleton, MN − Official Website

Cities in Minnesota
Cities in Swift County, Minnesota